Fox Plaza is a 29-story building located at 1390 Market Street in the Civic Center area of San Francisco. Built in 1966, the tower stands  on the site of the former historic Fox Theatre at 1350 Market, which was opened in June 1929 and demolished in 1963.

The first twelve floors contain office space. Unlike many buildings, Fox Plaza has a 13th floor actually labeled "13", although this floor is the service floor and is not rented out. The 14th floor contains laundry facilities as well as apartments, while floors 15 through 29 are exclusively rental apartments. The ground floor contains a gymnasium for residents.

There is a corner low-rise retail component in which a virtual-reality gym, offices, Starbucks, and a U.S. Post Office operate. The site formerly housed a credit union. The buildings' current owners are in the early planning and permitting stage of demolishing the low-rise retail and replacing it with a  building containing condominiums.

See also
 California Institute of Integral Studies
 List of tallest buildings in San Francisco

References

External links
 Essex Fox Plaza Official Website   http://www.essexapartmenthomes.com/california/san-francisco-bay-area-apartments/san-francisco-apartments/fox-plaza

Skyscraper office buildings in San Francisco
Market Street (San Francisco)
Residential skyscrapers in San Francisco
Office buildings completed in 1966
Residential buildings completed in 1966
Articles containing video clips
Victor Gruen buildings
1966 establishments in California